George Arthur Neeley (August 1, 1879January 1, 1919) was a U.S. Representative from Kansas.

Born in Detroit, Illinois, Neeley attended public schools in Joplin, Missouri and Wellston, Oklahoma. He earned a B.S. from Southwestern Baptist University in Jackson, Tennessee in 1902, and a J.D. from the University of Kansas in Lawrence, Kansas in 1904. He was employed for a while as a farmer and a teacher, before becoming a lawyer in private practice. He was an unsuccessful candidate for United States Representative to the 61st Congress in 1910.

Neeley was elected as a Democrat in a special election to fill the vacancy caused by the death of Edmond H. Madison to the 62nd Congress and to the succeeding Congress (January 9, 1912 - March 3, 1915). He was not a candidate for reelection to the 64th Congress in 1914, but was an unsuccessful candidate for election to the United States Senate. He died in Hutchinson, Kansas, and was interred in Oak Park Cemetery, Chandler, Oklahoma.

His daughter was Science Fiction author Margaret St. Clair.

References

1879 births
1919 deaths
People from Pike County, Illinois
Politicians from Joplin, Missouri
People from Lincoln County, Oklahoma
University of Kansas School of Law alumni
Kansas lawyers
Democratic Party members of the United States House of Representatives from Kansas
19th-century American politicians
19th-century American lawyers